National Secondary Route 129, or just Route 129 (or ) is a National Road Route of Costa Rica, located in the Heredia province.

Description
In Heredia province the route covers Belén canton (La Ribera district), Flores canton (Llorente district).

History
As part of the OBIS improvements over Route 1, the intersection between that route and Route 129 saw gains in the widening of the lanes to improve traffic.

References

Highways in Costa Rica